Sher-i-Kashmir Institute of Medical Sciences, often abbreviated as SKIMS, is the largest medical institute under State Legislature Act in Srinagar, in the Indian union territory of Jammu and Kashmir.

SKIMS is the only medical university of the union territory of J&K, headed by a Director who is also the Ex-officio Secretary to the Government.

Lieutenant Governor J&K is the Chairperson of the SKIMS governing body that performs the role of the cabinet for the semi-autonomous super-speciality hospital and the deemed university. In addition to the deemed university and the main hospital, the institute comprises the State Cancer Institute, Maternity Hospital, Nursing college, Paramedical college, and an affiliated medical college & hospital which is on the city outskirts at Bemina.

History
The construction commenced in the year 1976. The institute was partially commissioned on 5 December 1982. On 19 August 1983, Sher-i-Kashmir Institute of Medical Sciences was granted a Deemed University status. Every year the institute celebrates 5 December as its foundation day that coincides with the birthdate of Sheikh Mohammad Abdullah.

Departments
SKIMS has 5000+ employees working for it and incorporates more than 50 departments, including medicine and allied, surgery and allied, and other departments.
The medical faculty of each department consists of Professors, Additional Professors, Associate Professors, Assistant Professors, and Senior and Junior residents where the senior-most professor functions as the head.

Academics

Post doctoral (DM/MCH/DrNB) courses

D.M (Doctorate in Medicine)
 Cardiology
 Gastroenterology
 Endocrinology
 Medical Oncology
 Neurology
 Nephrology
 Clinical Hematology

M.Ch (Magister Chirurgia)
 Cardiac Surgery
 Neuro Surgery
 Plastic & Reconstructive Surgery
 Pediatric Surgery
 Urology
 Surgical Gastroenterology

DrNB (Doctorate of National Board)
 Cardiac-anesthesiology
 Neuro-anesthesiology
 Nuclear Medicine

Doctoral
Ph.D (Doctor of Philosophy)
 Clinical Biochemistry
 Clinical Pharmacology
 Immunology & Molecular Medicine
 Nuclear Medicine

Post graduate (MD/MS) courses
MD (Doctor of Medicine)
 Anesthesiology
 Community Medicine
 Emergency Medicine
 General Medicine
 Hospital Administration
 Microbiology
 Obstetrics & Gynecology
 Pathology
 Pediatrics
 Radiotherapy
 Radio-Diagnosis

MS (Master of Surgery)
 General Surgery
 Ophthalmology
 Orthopedics

Fellowships
 Hand and Microsurgery
 Interventional Cardiology
 Minimal Access Surgery
 Spine Surgery

Medical technology courses
M.Sc (Master of Science)
 Medical Lab. Technology
 Medical Technology
 Neonatal Sciences Technology
 Anaesthesia Critical Care & Operation Theatre Technology
 Cardiac Lab. Technology
 Radiotherapy Technology
 Radio-Diagnosis Technology
 Dialysis Technology
 Nuclear Medicine Technology
 DMRIT (Nuclear Medicine Technology)
 MRT (Medical Record Technician)

B.Sc (Bachelor of Science)
 Radiation Technology
 Anesthesia Critical Care & Operation Theater Technology
 Medical Lab Technology
 Medical Technology
 Perfusionist Technology
 Radiology & Imaging Technology

Undergraduate medical courses
 M.B.B.S

Nursing courses
 M.Sc. Nursing
 B.Sc. Nursing

See also
 90 Feet Road

References

External links 
 

Institute under State Legislature Act
Medical and health sciences universities in India
Medical colleges in Jammu and Kashmir
Regional Cancer Centres in India
Srinagar district
Research institutes in Jammu and Kashmir
Hospitals in Jammu and Kashmir
1977 establishments in Jammu and Kashmir
Hospitals established in 1977